Aileen Rose Dent (1890 – 30 March 1978) was an Australian artist known for her portraits, specifically her portrait of Australian aviator Jean Burns.

Biography
Dent was born in 1890 in Deniliquin, New South Wales. From 1909 to 1916 she was a student at the National Gallery Art School in Melbourne.

Dent exhibited regularly at the Atheneum Gallery and was a finalist in the Archibald Prize many times. Her paintings were included in the exhibit Australian Women Artists, One Hundred Years 1840 - 1940.

The National Gallery of Australia owns Dent's portrait of Dame Elizabeth Couchman.

Dent died in Wagga Wagga in 1978.

Works
The Charles Sturt University Art Collection holds the largest collection of her works, however her portraiture exists in other public and private collections. Works include:

 Portrait of Jean Burns 1934
 Portrait of H.P. Zwar 1937
 Portrait of Mrs Ryland 1927
 Portrait of Magnus Lagerlof 1935
 Portrait of Dr. H. Friedman 1932
 Portrait of C. Rigby C.B.E. 1942
 Portrait of Miss Gillman-Jones 1928
 Portrait of the Hon. King O'Malley 1934
 Portrait of Major General AC Short, CB, OBE 1954
 Portrait of Dr. Roland Wettenhall, M.B., B.S., F.R.A.P. 1952
 Portrait of Mr. Henry Searby, M.S. F.R.C.S., Q.H.S. 1953
 Portrait of Professor Boyce Gibson 1930, finalist, Archibald Prize, 1930
 Portrait of Professor HF Schraeder 1927
 Portrait of Albert Edward Swanson, Esq. 1925
 Portrait of Hon. RK Whately, MA, MLA 1955
 Portrait of Brin Newton John, Esq. M.A. 1956
 Portrait of Miss Joyce Raymond 1938
 Portrait of Sir John Jungwirth, Secretary to the Premier of Victoria 1958
 Portrait of Rev. J. Noble-MacKenzie 1940
 Portrait of Professor HC Summers 1943
 Portrait of Rev. Henry Evans 1945
 Portrait of Sgt. W. Geoffrey Smith 1943
 Portrait of Professor John Gillies 1940
 Portrait of C.N. McKenzie, Esq. 1939
 Portrait of Rev. A.J. Stewart 1944
 Portrait of Hon. Sirt Frederick W. Eggleston 1944
 Portrait of Sir Charles Lowe 1950
 Portrait of Dr J.M. Baldwin, astronomer 1941
 Portrait of The Right Rev. GA Wood, BA 1962
 Portrait of John Allan, Premier of Victoria 1928
Portrait of Robert McLeish, President of the Green Room Club ca.1950

Exhibitions 
 1943, from 1 December; Inclusion in a group show of ninety-one paintings and etchings with Arnold Shore, Max Meldrum, John Rowell, Jas. Quinn, John Farmer, Mary Hurry, Dora Serle, Margaret Pestell, Dora Wilson, Isabel Tweddle, Allan Jordan, Murray Griffin, Geo. Colville, and Victor Cog. Hawthorn Library.

References

External links 

 images of Aileen Dent's paintings on Mutual Art

1890 births
1978 deaths
20th-century Australian women artists
20th-century Australian artists
Archibald Prize finalists
Artists from New South Wales
National Gallery of Victoria Art School alumni